The Gibraltar International Chess Festival is a chess tournament held annually at the Caleta Hotel in Gibraltar. Its eleven days of competition usually run from late January to early February. The inaugural edition, then known as the Gibtelecom Gibraltar Chess Festival, took place in 2003, when fifty-nine competitors took part, of whom 24 held the FIDE Grandmaster title. In 2011 the festival was renamed to the Tradewise Gibraltar Chess Festival when Tradewise Insurance Company Ltd became the new primary sponsor. Beginning in 2019 Tradewise no longer sponsored the tournament and the name was changed to the Gibraltar International Chess Festival.

History
The main event, the Masters, is open to all, and was voted the best open event in the world by the Association of Chess Professionals in 2011, 2012, 2013 and 2014. Since 2011 an annual Gibraltar Junior International Chess Festival, also held at the Caleta Hotel, has been organised. It lasts five days and takes place in August and it comprises two events: under-16 and under-12.

The Director of the Gibraltar International Chess Festival has been Stuart Conquest since 2011.

In 2012, special stamps were issued  by the Gibraltar Post Office to commemorate the tenth edition of the chess festival.

In 2012 Chinese grandmaster Hou Yifan, at the time ranked number two female chess player in the world, scored 8 points from a possible 10 in the Masters, tying for first place with Nigel Short before losing a play-off match for the first prize. During this event Hou Yifan defeated Judit Polgár, number one rated female chess player in the world from 1989 to her retirement as a professional player in 2014.

The highest score achieved in a Gibraltar Masters event has been 9 points from a possible 10, by Vasyl Ivanchuk in 2011, with a performance rating of 2968.

In 2017, Hou Yifan caused controversy by intentionally throwing her final game of the tournament in 5 moves against Babu M.R. Lalith to protest the pairings. Hou had grown dissatisfied in recent years with playing in women-only tournaments, and had just dropped out of the Women's World Chess Championship cycle. In Gibraltar, she faced 7 women in her 10 games when the men/women ratio in the tournament was 4:1. The incident was resolved as an extremely unlikely series of computer-generated pairings which nevertheless actually happened, and the result of the protest game stood.

List of winners 
Since 2007, ties for first place in the Masters have been resolved by a tie-break.

{| class="sortable wikitable"
! Year !! Winner(s) !! Leading Female(s)
|-
| 2003
|   
|  
|-
| 2004
|  
|  
|-
| 2005
|      
|      
|-
| 2006
|  
|  
|-
| 2007
|  
|  
|-
| 2008
|  
|  
|-
| 2009
|  
|  
|-
| 2010
|  
|  
|-
| 2011
|  
|  
|-
| 2012
|  
|  
|-
| 2013
|  
|  
|-
| 2014
|  
|  
|-
| 2015
| 
| 
|-
| 2016
|  
|  
|-
| 2017
|  
| 
|-
| 2018
| 
| 
|-
| 2019
| 
| 
|-
| 2020
| 
| 
|-
| 2022
|  
| 
|}

References

External links
 Official website

Chess competitions
Festivals in Gibraltar
2003 in chess
Recurring sporting events established in 2003
2003 establishments in Gibraltar
International sports competitions hosted by Gibraltar
Annual events in Gibraltar
Chess in Gibraltar